Hannahville Indian School is a tribal K-12 school in Hannahville, Harris Township, Michigan. It is affiliated with the Bureau of Indian Education (BIE). Nah Tah Wahsh Public School Academy is a charter school affiliated with the institution. The school serves the Potawotami tribe and the Hannahville Indian Community.

In 1990 it was the only school in Michigan which had all of its students as Native Americans.

It is in proximity to Wilson.

The name "Nah Tah Wahsh" means "soaring eagles".

History
Two mothers, Sally Eichhorn and Gloria McCollough, began a campaign to create a tribal school in August 1975 to address the shortcomings of the education of tribal children at Bark River-Harris School. In 1976 the school opened, with four teachers. Initially the school was a K-8 school that occupied two rooms that were previously unused. The school went from K-8 to K-12 in 1984.

Before and in 1989 the school sought to get funding from the State of Michigan three times, with the third time being a request for $80,000. Frank Kelley, Attorney General of Michigan, denied these requests. In 1989 he stated that since Hannahville Indian was not under control of the state itself, it was not considered a public school in Michigan and could not get state funding as per an amendment made to the Michigan Constitution made in 1976 which prohibited the state government from funding schools not considered to be public. Additionally Kelley stated that the school did not admit non-Native Americans while Ken Pond, the principal of Hannahville Indian, stated that it did.

The Nah Tah Wahsh Public School Academy, which could legally enroll non-Native Americans, opened in 1995.

Curriculum
The school includes tribal culture and customs in addition to academic subjects.

The school has the intention of continuing the tribal language; such language instruction began after 1996.

Athletics
In 1990 the school created a basketball team.

References

External links
 Hannahville Indian School

Public K-12 schools in Michigan
Native American K-12 schools
1976 establishments in Michigan
Educational institutions established in 1976
Education in Menominee County, Michigan
Native American history of Michigan